Seema Desai (9 January 1965 – 14 June 2013) was an Indian cricketer who played at the Test level for India. She was a right-hand batswoman and bowled medium pace. In her career spanning more than 30 years starting 1980, Desai played over 1,000 professional matches and took more than 900 wickets while scoring 14 centuries with her batting. She died in 2013 from cancer.

References

External links 
 

1965 births
2013 deaths
India women Test cricketers
Indian women cricketers
Jharkhand women cricketers